The 2017 Coupe de France Final was a football match between French clubs Angers and Paris Saint-Germain to determine the winner of the 2016–17 Coupe de France, the 100th season of France's all-main-divisions football cup. It took place on 27 May at the Stade de France in Saint-Denis, Paris.

Background
This match was Angers' 2nd Coupe de France final (their first in 60 years), and they had never won the trophy before. Their last final was in 1957, which they lost 6–3 to Toulouse.

Paris Saint-Germain, meanwhile, had played in 14 finals and won 10 titles (a shared record), and they were the defending champions, having defeated Marseille 4–2 in the 2016 final.

Route to the final

''Note: H = home fixture, A = away fixture

Match

Summary
The only goal came in the first minute of second-half stoppage time; a corner from the right by Ángel Di María was headed in with the back of his head by Issa Cissokho at the near post for an own goal.

Details

References

Coupe de France Final 2017
Coupe de France Final 2017
2017
Coupe de France Final
Final
Sport in Saint-Denis, Seine-Saint-Denis
Coupe de France Final